The Women's 50 metre butterfly competition of the 2021 FINA World Swimming Championships (25 m) was held on 19 and 20 December 2021.

Records
Prior to the competition, the existing world and championship records were as follows.

The following new records were set during this competition:

Results

Heats
The heats were started on 18 December at 09:43.

Semifinals
The semifinals were started on 18 December at 18:46.

Final
The final was held on 19 December at 18:06.

References

Women's 50 metre butterfly
2021 in women's swimming